This is a list of cricket players who have played representative cricket for Southern Province in Sri Lanka. The team is currently known as Ruhuna, but has also played as Southern Province until 2005.

It includes players that have played at least one match, in senior First-Class, List A cricket, or Twenty20 matches. Practice matches are not included, unless they have officially been classified at First-class tour matches.

The Inter-Provincial Cricket Tournament is the premier domestic cricket competition in Sri Lanka. It was founded in 1990.

First Class Players
All of the cricket players who have represented Ruhuna in first class cricket in order of their appearance for the team:

List 'A' Players
All of the Players who have represented Ruhuna in List A cricket domestic one day competitions:

Twenty20 Players
All of the Players who have represented Ruhuna in Twenty20 domestic competitions:

External links
Players Who Have Played For Ruhuna
Sri Lanka Cricket

 
Ruhuna